was a Japanese alpine and cross-country skier. He competed at the 1936 Winter Olympics in the alpine skiing combined event, but failed to complete it. At the same Olympics he finished 28th in the 50 km cross-country competition and 59th in the 18 km cross-country event. As a member of the Japanese team he finished twelfth in the first ever held cross-country relay contest.

References

1914 births
1986 deaths
Japanese male alpine skiers
Japanese male cross-country skiers
Olympic alpine skiers of Japan
Olympic cross-country skiers of Japan
Alpine skiers at the 1936 Winter Olympics
Cross-country skiers at the 1936 Winter Olympics
20th-century Japanese people